The RAF Force Protection Force Headquarters was created in 2004 as the successor to the Tactical Survive to Operate Headquarters (Tac STO HQ). It controls the Force Protection Wings which are tasked with protection of RAF stations in the UK and overseas. Each Wing is based around a mix of RAF Regiment and RAF Police squadrons and other support staff.

Structure
As of 2018, there are seven Force Protection wings.

No. 2 Force Protection Wing
RAF Leeming

 No. 2 Force Protection Wing Headquarters
 No. 34 Squadron RAF Regiment
 No. 609 (West Riding) Squadron RAuxAF

RAF Honington

 No. 1 (Tactical) Police Squadron

No. 3 Force Protection Wing RAF
Its motto is Parare Et Protegrere ("Prepare & Protect").

RAF Marham

 No. 3 RAF Force Protection Wing Headquarters

 No. 2620 (County of Norfolk) Squadron RAuxAF Regiment
 No. 6 RAF Police Squadron
 No. 15 Squadron RAF Regiment

No. 4 Force Protection Wing RAF
RAF Brize Norton

 No. 4 RAF Force Protection Wing Headquarters
 No. 2 Squadron RAF Regiment
No. 2624 (County of Oxfordshire) Squadron RAuxAF Regiment
 No. 7 RAF Police Squadron

No. 5 Force Protection Wing RAF
RAF Lossiemouth

 No. 5 Force Protection Wing Headquarters
 No. 51 Squadron RAF Regiment
 No. 603 (City of Edinburgh) Squadron RAuxAF
 No. 2622 (Highland) Squadron RAuxAF Regiment

 No. 4 RAF Police Squadron

No. 7 Force Protection Wing RAF
RAF Coningsby

 No. 7 Force Protection Wing Headquarters
Air Land Integration Cell

RAF Honington

No. 1 Squadron RAF Regiment

RAF Honington

No. 2623 (East Anglian) Squadron RAuxAF Regiment

No. 8 Force Protection Wing RAF
RAF Waddington

 No. 8 Force Protection Wing Headquarters
No. 2503 (County of Lincoln) Squadron RAuxAF Regiment
No. 5 RAF Police Squadron

RAF Northolt

No. 63 (King's Colour) Squadron RAF Regiment

See also
 Airfield Defence Guards (Australia)
 RNZAF Force Protection (New Zealand)

References

Air force ground defence units and formations
Royal Air Force stations